Viola tomentosa is a species of violet known by the common names feltleaf violet and woolly violet. It is endemic to the central Sierra Nevada of California, where it occurs in various types of dry mountain forest habitat. This small herb grows from a deep taproot, reaching a maximum height of 5 to 10 centimeters. The herbage is coated with woolly hairs. The leaves have oval blades borne on petioles a few centimeters long. A solitary flower is borne on a short upright stem. It is under a centimeter long with five yellow petals. The lower three petals are veined with dark brown and the upper two are stained brown or purplish on the back sides.

References

External links
Jepson Manual Treatment
USDA Plants Profile
Photo gallery

tomentosa
Endemic flora of California